Steve Reeves is a computer scientist based at the University of Waikato in New Zealand. He is the Associate Dean and the Programme Co-ordinator of Software Engineering. He has undertaken research work on the Z notation, formal methods for GUI design and a general theory of refinement.

Steve Reeves' academic work is in the area of formal methods to aid software engineering. In particular, he has undertaken research into the design and use of logics for specification. With Prof. Martin Henson, he has studied the formal semantics of the Z notation in detail, in relation to the international ISO standard for Z.

He has recently started work (initially with colleagues from Data61) on uses for blockchain. He has had a seed grant awarded by the New Zealand Science for Technological Innovation fund SfTI.

Reeves has delivered talks internationally, including as the opening talk in the BCS-FACS seminar series at the British Computer Society in London in 2005.

Steve Reeves is currently Chair of the Z User Group, and the New Zealand member of the Australasian Software Engineering Conference (ASWEC) Steering Committee and the Asia-Pacific Software Engineering Conference (APSEC), held at Waikato in December 2016 .
He is a Fellow of the British Computer Society, a Fellow of the Institute of IT Professionals (formerly the New Zealand Computer Society), and is a Chartered IT Professional (CITPNZ).

Reeves has published a number of academic papers.

References

External links
 Steve Reeves home page
 
 
 

1957 births
Living people
People from Brighton
Alumni of the University of Birmingham
English computer scientists
British expatriates in New Zealand
Formal methods people
Academics of the University of Essex
Academics of Queen Mary University of London
Academic staff of the University of Waikato
Fellows of the British Computer Society